Belmont Estates is a census-designated place in Rockingham County, Virginia. The population as of the 2010 Census was 1,263. It is a suburban bedroom community just to the west of Harrisonburg.

References

Census-designated places in Rockingham County, Virginia
Census-designated places in Virginia